WQRW (93.5 FM) is a radio station broadcasting a hot adult contemporary format. Licensed to Wellsville, New York, United States, the station serves the Olean area.  The station is currently (as of 2021) owned by Robert Pfunter and features programming from AP Radio and Westwood One's Bright AC network.

Origins
The 93.5 frequency in Wellsville was previously used by WJQZ, now at 103.5 MHz.

WQRW was intended to be a repeater for WQRS, a classic rock station known on air as "Q Rock", when its construction permit was filed in fall 2006. However, WQRS's lone local jock, Scott Douglas, left the station and went to WESB/WBRR instead, and WQRS itself became little more than a satellite station. Instead, the ownership decided to give WQRW its own identity and thus was branded instead as "Q 93.5".

Pfunter was forced to sell off most of his other radio holdings (most of them to Sound Communications, who later sold to Seven Mountains Media in 2021) due to a bankruptcy in the early 2010s but has retained ownership of WQRW.

References

External links

QRW
Hot adult contemporary radio stations in the United States
Radio stations established in 2007
2007 establishments in New York (state)